Bagienice may refer to:
Bagienice, Masovian Voivodeship (east-central Poland)
Bagienice, Grajewo County in Podlaskie Voivodeship (north-east Poland)
Bagienice, Łomża County in Podlaskie Voivodeship (north-east Poland)
Bagienice, Warmian-Masurian Voivodeship (north Poland)